The Triflers may refer to:

The Triflers, 1920 silent American film directed by Christy Cabanne
The Triflers, 1924 silent American film directed by Louis Gasnier